Murrills is an English surname. Notable people with this surname include:

 Adam Murrills (born 1990), English squash player
 Timothy Murrills (born 1953), English cricketer

See also
 Murrill

Surnames of English origin